Hot Man Pussy is the second album by noise rock band Tragic Mulatto, released in 1989 by Alternative Tentacles.

Release and reception 

Ira Robbins of the Trouser Press gave the album an enthusiastic review, although mentioning that the "incoherent blur of feedback and neck-wringing gets fairly numbing."

Hot Man Pussy was the band's only album to be issued on CD, titled Italians Fall Down and Look Up Your Dress and featuring additional tracks. The CD comprises Hot Man Pussy in its entirety, six tracks from their debut Locos por el Sexo (omitting the tracks "Underwear Maintenance" and "Swineherd in the Tenderloin") and the song "OK Baby OK", which was previously only available on the various artist compilation Oops! Wrong Stereotype.

Track listing

Personnel 
Adapted from the Hot Man Pussy liner notes.

Tragic Mulatto
 Lance Boyle (as Reverend Elvister Shanksley) – bass guitar, vocals, banjo, harmonica
 Gail Coulson (as Flatula Lee Roth) – vocals, saxophone, tuba
 Jehu Goder (as Jack-Buh) – guitar
 Marc Galipeau (as Humpty Doody) – drums
 Marianne Riddle (as Bambi Nonymous) – Drums

Additional musicians and production
 Klaus Flouride – production

Release history

References

External links 
 

1989 albums
Alternative Tentacles albums
Tragic Mulatto (band) albums
Albums produced by Klaus Flouride